John Thomas Walker (July 27, 1925 – September 30, 1989) was Bishop of Washington from 1977 to 1989 in the Episcopal Church. From 1978 to 1989, he also served as Dean of Washington National Cathedral. Previously, he served as Bishop Coadjutor from 1976 to 1977 and Bishop Suffragan from 1971 to 1976.  He was the first African-American Bishop of Washington.

Biography 
Bishop Walker was born in Barnesville, Georgia and brought up in Detroit.  He was the first African American to be admitted as a student to the Virginia Theological Seminary in 1951.  Bishop Walker first came to Washington as the Canon of Washington National Cathedral.

He earned a world reputation for social activism and was a good friend of Archbishop Desmond Tutu.  He was once arrested at a protest rally against apartheid at the South African Embassy. From 1975 until his death in 1989, Bishop Walker served as President of the Board of Directors of Africare.  The organization now presents the Bishop John T. Walker Distinguished Humanitarian Service Award each year in his honor.

To honor the first African-American Bishop of the Episcopal Diocese of Washington and all of his contributions, The Bishop John T. Walker School opened in September 2008 as a tuition-free, kindergarten through sixth grade school for boys in Southeast, Washington, D.C. It was founded by the Episcopal Diocese of Washington in response to the serious educational challenges facing African American boys in the low-income communities east of the Anacostia River.

Also named after Walker is the Bishop John T. Walker Learning Center in Washington, D.C., whose mission is "to support, encourage, and facilitate life-long learning to all peoples through instruction, dialogue, exploration, human interactions, and exchanges".

Bishop Walker died suddenly on September 30, 1989 at the age of 64, of heart failure following triple bypass surgery. He is buried in Washington National Cathedral.

References

External links
The Bishop John T. Walker School for Boys
Bishop John T. Walker National Learning Center

Episcopal bishops of Washington
1925 births
1989 deaths
People from Barnesville, Georgia
African-American Episcopalians
Virginia Theological Seminary alumni
20th-century Anglican bishops in the United States
Religious leaders from Georgia (U.S. state)
Clergy from Detroit
20th-century African-American people
Burials at Washington National Cathedral